"Can't Get Enough (Of Your Love)" is a song by English singer Kim Wilde, released as the third single from her seventh album, Love Moves (1990). It was also the first single from this album to be released in France (in its full-length album form), and the second in continental Europe and Australia (where it was edited). It was not released in the UK. The track was extended for the 12" and CD-single formats.

Charts

References

1990 singles
1990 songs
Kim Wilde songs
Songs written by Kim Wilde
Songs written by Ricky Wilde